Kreševka (also called Kreševčica (Крешевчица) by the local population) is a small river in central part of Bosnia and Herzegovina. The Kreševka is left and main tributary of the Lepenica River. The Kreševka and the Lepenica confluence is at the entrance of Kiseljak.

Rivers of Bosnia and Herzegovina